Johnny Sias (born 1952) is a professional disc golfer from Lavalette, West Virginia. He joined the Professional Disc Golf Association in 1986 and became a professional in 1983.

Professional career 

Sias won the 1986 PDGA Professional World Championship in Charlotte, North Carolina, by seven strokes over Clint Mcclellan and Geoff Lissaman. He has also won the 2012 PDGA Grand Masters World Championship, the 2013 Senior Grand Masters World Championship, the 2019 PDGA Masters 65+ World Championship, and the 2022 PDGA Masters 70+ World Championship. Sias finished second, five strokes behind winner Sam Ferrans, at the 1984 PDGA Professional World Championship in Rochester, New York. In 242 career PDGA events, Sias has 77 wins and amassed $51,164 in winnings. He was inducted into the Disc Golf Hall of Fame in 2001. In 2016, he was the first person inducted into the West Virginia Disc Golf Hall of Fame.

Sponsorships 
Sias is sponsored by Innova Champion Discs on their All Stars Team.

Personal life 
Sias was born in Huntington, West Virginia, and raised in Lincoln County, West Virginia. He married his wife, Adele, in 1978.

References 

American disc golfers
1952 births
Living people
People from Wayne County, West Virginia
Disc golf
Sportspeople from Huntington, West Virginia
People from Lincoln County, West Virginia